Gennady Yakovlevich Krasnikov (born April 30, 1958 in Tambov, RSFSR) is a Russian scientist in the field of semiconductor physics who is serving as the president of the Russian Academy of Sciences since 2020.

Biography
Krasnikov graduated with honors from the Faculty of Physics and Technology of the Moscow Institute of Electronic Technology in 1981. From 1981, he successively held various positions, as engineer at the Research Institute of Molecular Electronics and the Mikron plant up to the General Director of JSC NIIME and Mikron (from 1991 to 2016). In September 2017, he participated in the election for the president the Russian Academy of Sciences, passed the approval procedure required by the new rules in the government of the Russian Federation. He is head of the Priority Technological Area for Electronic Technologies of the Russian Federation and a member of the Advisory Scientific Council of the Skolkovo Innovation Center. On December 12, 2022, he became a member of the expert council under the Government of Russia.

References

Living people
1958 births
People from Tambov
Russian physicists
Full Members of the Russian Academy of Sciences
Presidents of the Russian Academy of Sciences

ru:Красников, Геннадий Яковлевич